Laura J. Person is an American mathematician specializing in low-dimensional topology. She is a distinguished teaching professor of mathematics at the State University of New York at Potsdam.

Education and career
Person completed her Ph.D. in mathematics at the University of California, Santa Barbara in 1988. Her dissertation, A Piece-Wise Linear Proof That The Singular Norm Is The Thurston Norm, concerned the Thurston norm, an invariant of three-dimensional spaces; it was supervised by Martin Scharlemann. She joined the faculty at SUNY Potsdam in 1989. At Potsdam, she is also the academic coordinator for volleyball.

Book
Person is the co-author of the textbook Write Your Own Proofs In Set Theory and Discrete Mathematics (Zinka Press, 2005). The book's other co-author, Amy Babich, is a Texas-based mathematician, local politician, novelist, and recumbent bicycle seller.

Recognition
In 2008, Person won the Clarence F. Stephens Award for Distinguished College or University Teaching of the Seaway Section of the Mathematical Association of America.
She was named as a distinguished teaching professor and a member of the SUNY Distinguished Academy in 2016.

References

Year of birth missing (living people)
Living people
20th-century American mathematicians
21st-century American mathematicians
American women mathematicians
State University of New York at Potsdam
20th-century women mathematicians
21st-century women mathematicians
20th-century American women
21st-century American women